The Île-de-France is a magnet for immigrants, hosting one of the largest concentrations of immigrants in Europe. As of 2006, about 35% of people (4 million) living in the region were either immigrant (17%) or born to at least one immigrant parent (18%).

If the region, primary seat of French political and economic power for centuries, has always attracted immigrants, modern immigration can be traced back to the second half of the 19th century when France emerged as an immigration destination with Eastern European Jews fleeing persecutions, and Southern Europeans (mostly Italians) and Belgians seeking better economic conditions. During the first half of the 20th century, immigrants were mostly Europeans, but after decolonisation, and during the French post-war economic boom, many immigrants came from former French colonies (chiefly the Magreb and West Africa). At the 2010 census, 23.0% of the total population in the Île-de-France region were born outside of Metropolitan France, up from 19.7% at the 1999 census.

Among these people born outside Metropolitan France, 1,611,989 were immigrants (see definition below the table), making up 14.7% of the region's total population. INSEE estimated that on 1 January 2005, the number of immigrants in the region had reached 1,916,000, making up 16.7% of its total population. This is an increase of 304,000 immigrants in slightly less than six years.

According to a study in 2009, nearly 56% of all newborns in the region in 2007 had at least one parent originated from sub-Saharan Africa, Turkey, Maghreb or Overseas departments and territories of France.

People under 18 of foreign origin 

In 2005, 37% of young people under 18 were of foreign origin (at least one immigrant parent) in Île-de-France, including a quarter of African origin (Maghreb and sub-Saharan Africa).

People under 18 of Maghrebi, sub-Saharan and Turkish origin became a majority in several cities of the region (Clichy-sous-Bois, Mantes-la-Jolie, Grigny, Saint-Denis, Les Mureaux, Saint-Ouen, Sarcelles, Pierrefitte-sur-Seine, Garges-lès-Gonesse, Aubervilliers, Stains, Gennevilliers et Épinay-sur-Seine). Young people of Maghrebi origin comprised about 12% of the population of the region, 22% of that of département of the Seine-Saint-Denis district, and 37% of the 18th arrondissement of Paris. In Grigny, 31% of young people are of sub-Saharan origin

In the département of Seine-Saint-Denis (population 1.5 million), 56.7% of people under 18 are of foreign origin, including 38% of African origin. Islam is the main religion.

Notes and references 

Immigration to France